Coleophora bifrondella is a moth of the family Coleophoridae. It is found in Spain, France and Italy.

Its scientific name is Coleophora bifrondella Walsingham, 1891

The larvae feed on the leaves of Satureia montana.

Here are some species classification:-

 Kingdom : Animalia
 Phylum: Arthropoda
 Class: Insecta
 Order: Lepidoptera
 Family: Coleophoridae
 Genus: Coleophora Hubner, 1822

References

bifrondella
Moths described in 1891
Moths of Europe